Allotinus davidis is a butterfly in the family Lycaenidae. It was described by John Nevill Eliot in 1959. It is found in Thailand, Peninsular Malaysia, Singapore and on Sumatra and possibly Borneo.

References

Butterflies described in 1959
Allotinus
Butterflies of Borneo